Eggleston Motorsport is an Australian motor racing team which is currently competing in the Dunlop Super2 Series, Dunlop Super3 Series and the Australian GT Championship. The team's current Super2 drivers are Matt McLean and Jack Sipp, with Jack Perkins, Tim Blanchard and Tony D'Alberto stepping in for guest appearances.

EMS was born out of Eggleston Motorsport & Service Centre. The motorsport division is now the primary driver for the operation. EMS has been a key competitor in the Dunlop Series since 2010. Team co-owner Rachael Wagg said in December 2014 that the team was interested in a wildcard V8 Supercar entry or even an endurance campaign, though was not currently considering stepping into the main series in the near future.

Super 2 Series. 
Originally started to further the driving career of owner Ben Eggleston, EMS entered select rounds of the 2006 Fujitsu V8 Supercar Series with a former Team Dynamik VX Commodore. Eggleston had a modest year, and would go on to finish 34th in the standings.

After taking a years hiatus the team would return for the 2008 Fujitsu series with a full time effort for Ben Eggleston, the team would also enter a second car at select rounds for Taz Douglas & Simon Wills. Eggleston would again have a modest year, finishing 24th overall. The second car would have a similar season, with Douglas and Wills not reaching the top 10 in either of their stints in the car.

For 2009 the team would scale back to a single car, part time entry for Ben Eggleston. Eggleston would begin the season in an older spec VZ before switching to a newer VE for the final round. Despite only entering 4 rounds, Eggleston would have his best season in the second tier supercars series, finishing 15th, achieving his best race result of 7th along the way.

In 2010 the team would expand, running a slew of drivers part time across 3 cars. Cameron McConville, Craig Baird, & David Reynolds would enter a single round alongside Eggleston himself, while Nick Percat would compete in the final 3 rounds of the series for the team. Percat would achieve the team's first 3 podiums during his stint with EMS on his way to 4th in the final standings. McConville would win the team's first race at the Winton round, with Reynolds also achieving a podium at the Townsville event.

The team would again enter a variety of drivers part time in 2011. Cameron McConville would enter 2 rounds and achieve a best race result of 4th. Debutants Gavin Bullas & Lindsay Yelland would enter a round each for the team. EMS would further scale back their involvement in the 2012 Fujitsu V8 Supercar Series. Ben Eggleston would enter only a single round.

The team would expand for the 2013 season, entering one full time car, driven by Jay Verdnick for round one, and Jack Perkins for the rest of the season. A second car would be entered for the majority of the season, with Daniel Gaunt entered for rounds 1 through 4, and Ant Pederson for round 5. Perkins would score 2 wins and 6 other podiums on the season on his way to 4th in the standings, matching the team's previous best. Gaunt would also score 3 podiums for the team.

2014 was a breakout season for the team. Expanding to 3 full-time cars for the first time ever, the team would take on Red Bull Racing Australia's endurance driver and former series champion, Paul Dumbrell. Alongside Dumbrell would Garry Jacobson and Ant Pederson. Dumbrell would win 6 races on his way to the title, taking 3 other podiums. Jacobson would score a single podium, finishing 11th overall, with Pederson finishing 10th.

EMS would again enter Dumbrell & Jacobson in 2015, alongside Pederson for rounds 1 through 6. The team would also enter a 4th car for Debutant, & 2015 Kumho Series winner Liam McAdam for round 6, with McAdam replacing Pederson for round 7. Dumbrell would win 5 races, and take 7 other podiums but would fall just short of the championship, finishing second. Jacobson would secure 2 more podiums on his way to 6th in the championship. Pederson would have more modest results, but still finish 13th in the championship despite missing a round. McAdam would famously crash during qualifying for the Sydney round of the series, almost rolling his car before slamming heavily into the tyre barrier.

For 2016 the team would enter 2 cars full time. A slew of drivers would share time in 2 of the team's cars, with McAdam & Taz Douglas sharing the No. 38. Taz Douglas would drive the No. 54 when not driving the 28, he would pair up with Grant Denyer for the Bathurst 250. Dumbrell would contest rounds 1 through 6 with the team, before withdrawing from the final round due to illness. Dumbrell would finish 7th in the championship standings, only taking 3 wins. Douglas would finish 5th overall, taking one podium for the team.

The team would again expand to 3 full time cars in the 2017 Super 2 Series, with the purchase of several ex-Red Bull Racing Australia VF Commodore's. Paul Dumbrell would remain with the team, joined by debutants Will Brown and Nathan Morcom. Dumbrell would win 7 races during a season long battle with eventual series winner Todd Hazelwood, Dumbrell would finish runner up. Brown would secure one podium on his way to 9th in the series, with Morcom taking a best race result of 7th, finishing 13th overall.

For 2018 the team would retain Dumbrell, Brown, and Morcom, as well as adding a 4th car for rookie Dominic Storey. Dumbrell would win 5 races and take 6 second place finishes, again finishing runner up in the series. Brown would improve, taking 2 podiums to finish 6th overall. Morcom & Storey would struggle, finishing 19th and 15th respectively.

EMS would shake up their roster for 2019, With Will Brown retaining his seat, being joined by Dean Fiore and later Jack Perkins, as well as rookie Justin Ruggier. Brown would win his first race, however would place lower than his previous attempt, finishing 9th. Perkins would take a 2nd at the Sandown round on his way to 14th in the championship despite missing the first 2 rounds. Ruggier would finish 11th.

The team would again switch up their drivers for the shortened 2020 Super 2 Series, entering Jack Perkins & Brodie Kostecki. Kostecki would take pole and the first two race wins as well as the round at the 2020 Adelaide 500, before having car issues at Sydney that would see him finish 9th and 3rd respectively for the 2 races. Perkins would have 2 retirements at Adelaide and finish solidly at Sydney. Ultimately the team would miss the season finale at Bathurst, as well as a shot at the championship due to the ongoing 2020 Coronavirus Pandemic, being unable to quarantine their largely contractor based staff.

For 2021 the team will continue running both of their ex-Triple Eight Commodores driven by Super3 graduate Jack Sipp and two time Australian Karting Champion Matt McLean plus the team has also signed Bradley Neil to drive an ex-Holden Racing Team VF Commodore which was purchased from Anderson Motorsport which was driven by Tyler Everingham before being sold on to Neil. Neil had to suspend his 2021 campaign due to his battle with cancer after just one round due to the return of Non-Hodgkin Lymphoma.
He was replaced by Jack Perkins who competed for the team for the 2020 season.

GT Racing 
For the 2012 Australian GT Championship the team would debut a pair of Aston Martin DBRS9's For Martin Wagg & Ben Eggleston. Eggleston would have the better season, taking 2 podiums on his way to 6th in the championship. Wagg would struggle, finishing 15th.

The team would return to GT Racing in 2016, running a Mercedes-AMG GT3 for Dominic Storey in the 2016 Australian Endurance Championship. Storey would finish 2nd in the series, behind the combination of Nathan Morcom and Grant Denyer. He would take 1 podium and 2 fastest laps on the season. EMS would enter Tony Bates in the 2017 Australian GT Championship for rounds 1 through 4. Bates would win round 1, with 2 races wins, he would go on to finish 8th in the series despite missing the final round. Storey would return to the team in 2018, running alongside Peter Hackett in the No. 63 AMG GT3 for round 1, Jake Fouracre would enter the other endurance races with Hackett. he would finish runner up in the series to Fraser Ross. Yasser Shahin would have his AMG prepared & run by the team for select rounds as well, partnered with Luke Youlden for the endurance races. Hackett would remain with the team for the 2019 Australian GT Championship, again partnering with Storey for the endurance races. He would again finish runner up in the series, this time to Geoff Emery.

Kumho Tyre Series 
Eggleston Motorsport first entered the 3rd Tier Supercars Championship, then known as the Shannon's V8 Touring Car National Series in 2009. Ben Eggleston would drive the team's VX Commodore that would go on to compete in the 2009 Fujitsu Series in 1 round. He would finish on the podium in his debut race. For 2010 Eggleston would enter another single round, taking 2 podiums.

The team would take a 4 year hiatus from the series before returning in 2014 to run Justin Ruggier full time. Ruggier would win the series, taking 5 race wins along the way. Cameron McConville would enter the 4th round at Phillip Island for the team, taking 2 race wins.

The team would become back to back champions in 2015 with Liam McAdam winning the series, he would win 8 races on his way to the title. Jack Perkins would be entered for the first round at Sandown, he would sweep the round, taking all 3 race wins, pole positions, and fastest laps.

Six Years after they won there last championship they came back to the championship and signed Steven Page to drive his own Holden VE Commodore for the 2021 Super3 Series.

Super2 drivers 
The following is a list of drivers who have driven for the team in the Super2 Series, in order of first appearance. Drivers who only drove for the team on a part-time basis are listed in italics

 Ben Eggleston (2006, 2008-2010, 2012)
 Taz Douglas (2008, 2016)
 Simon Wills (2008)
 Craig Baird (2010)
 Cameron McConville (2010-2011)
 David Reynolds (2010)
 Nick Percat (2010)
 Gavin Bullas (2011)
 Lindsay Yelland (2011)
 Daniel Gaunt (2013)
 Ant Pedersen (2013-2015)
 Jay Verdnik (2013)
 Jack Perkins (2013, 2019-2021)
 Garry Jacobson (2014-2015)
 Paul Dumbrell (2014-2018)
 Liam McAdam (2015-2016)
 Grant Denyer (2016)
 Will Brown (2017-2019)
 Nathan Morcom (2017-2018)
 Dominic Storey (2018)
 Dean Fiore (2019)
 Justin Ruggier (2019)
 Brodie Kostecki (2020)
 Bradley Neil (2021)
 Jack Sipp (2021)
 Matt McLean (2021-Present)
 Tim Blanchard  (2021)
 Tony D'Alberto (2021)
 Josh Fife (2021)
 Cameron Crick (2022)

Super3 drivers 
The following is a list of drivers who have driven for the team in the Super3 Series, in order of first appearance. Drivers who only drove for the team on a part-time basis are listed in italics

 Ben Eggleston (2009-2010)
 Cameron McConville (2014)
 Justin Ruggier (2014)
 Liam McAdam (2015)
 Jack Perkins (2015)
 Steven Page (2021-2022)
 Kai Allen (2022)
 Matthew McCutcheon (2023)

References

External links 

Supercars Championship teams
Australian auto racing teams
Sports teams in Victoria (Australia)
Auto racing teams established in 2006
2006 establishments in Australia